Charles Sabin Taft (August 1835 – December 18, 1900) was a bystander physician who was pressed into service during the assassination of Abraham Lincoln.

Lincoln's assassination
On April 14, 1865, Taft was watching Our American Cousin at Ford's Theatre in Washington, D.C., which President Abraham Lincoln was attending. Taft had a good view of those in the presidential box. He observed that First Lady Mary Todd Lincoln often called her husband's attention to aspects of the action onstage, and "seemed to take great pleasure in witnessing his enjoyment". After Lincoln was shot, Taft was boosted up from the stage to the president's box.

See also
 Anderson Ruffin Abbott
 Joseph K. Barnes
 Julia Taft Bayne
 Charles H. Crane
 Albert Freeman Africanus King
 Charles Augustus Leale

References

Sources
 Kunhardt, Dorothy Meserve, and Kunhardt Jr., Phillip B. Twenty Days: A Narrative in Text and Pictures of the Assassination of Abraham Lincoln and the Twenty Days and Nights That Followed. New York: Castle Books, 1965.

External links
Diary of Horatio Nelson Taft 1861-1865
Tad Lincoln's Father - complete online text

19th-century American physicians
People associated with the assassination of Abraham Lincoln
1835 births
1900 deaths